The Glenbrook Vintage Railway (GVR) is a heritage steam railway in Glenbrook, New Zealand.

The GVR is run by a trust board of three trustees elected and appointed from Railway Enthusiasts Society (RES) membership. The board appoints a general manager who is responsible for day-to-day operation.

The railway is staffed and maintained by volunteers and RES membership provides automatic access to all activities as a volunteer. Special Events are often held, such as "Day Out With Thomas" weekends, Railfan Days (with display freight trains and other unique consists), Country and Western days and night steam runs.

History
The GVR is based on part of the old Waiuku branch line which opened in 1922 and closed from Glenbrook to Waiuku in 1967.

The initial concept for a steam-powered tourist railway was initiated when the New Zealand Government Railways announced the closure of the line, which was a popular route for excursions operated by the RES. Re-construction of the GVR began in 1970, slashing back overgrown gorse that had covered the line, renewing rail and building the Pukeoware Depot and the terminus at Glenbrook.

Delivery of items of rolling stock included the "delivery" rail-tours bringing the steam locomotive fleet from the South Island back to Auckland for use at Glenbrook. Carriages were sourced out of stock being retired from the Auckland commuter network at the time, and in some cases (such as carriage "Manukura"), where the item of rolling stock had sentimental value to the members of the RES.

In 1977 the railway opened between Glenbrook and Pukeoware. Early services over the railway used the line's ex-Ministry of Works Ruston diesel (later GVR No. 3), a motor trolley, and several material trolleys fitted with longitudinal seats. For the first proper services, steam locomotive No. 1 (formerly WW 480) was used with two carriages, a guard's van and an open car.

In 1985, JA 1250 (along with KA 945) hauled the first mainline steam excursion from Auckland to Wellington and return. This was the first steam excursion to run after NZR lifted their ban on steam traction.

In 1986 an extension was completed to Fernleigh,  from Glenbrook. On 5 December 1986 DC 4444 and six Cityrail branded carriages made the run from Auckland to Fernleigh (including the GVR section). The next day a special excursion train ran from Auckland, carrying Prime Minister David Lange, who presided at the opening on 6 December 1986. JA 1250 and DA 529 hauled a large public excursion out to Glenbrook station from Auckland dubbed the "Sunset Coast Express". Acquisitions and improvements to track and structures occurred during the late 1980s and 1990s. In 1995 plans were laid out for the extension of the railway line from the Fernleigh Terminal into the actual town of Waiuku. Planning, lobbying public support and fundraising continued until the major physical works began in 1999. As the original Waiuku station and yards had been developed following the closure of the line in 1968, the decision was made to have the new Waiuku Station at Tamakae Reserve.

As part of the work, a new bridge would be required to reach Tamakae Reserve, and so a temporary station was opened at Victoria Avenue in Waiuku, just behind the Cosmopolitan Club. When the final extension is completed, it is intended that Victoria Ave will be retained. Member preview trains ran on Easter Saturday 2010, and at Labour Weekend 2010 the new route was opened to regular service by former Waiuku Mayor Kevan Lawrence and Mayor of Auckland Len Brown. The heritage 1922 concrete bridge known as Black Bridge has been strengthened to allow trains to operate beneath it, and laying of newly welded rail onto concrete sleepers (a first at the railway) has been completed. Work continues on planning the requirements of the final extension to Tamakae reserve.

The millionth passenger was carried on 7 January 2007.

Operations

Standard operating days
The railway operates selected Sunday's and public holiday weekend (except on Christmas Day and Boxing Day) between Labour weekend and Queen's Birthday weekend.

Steam train services depart from Glenbrook every 90 minutes between 11 am and 4 pm, with a round trip taking approximately 60 minutes. The return journey consists of a 20-minute non-stop run from Glenbrook to Victoria Avenue, a five-minute stop where the engine runs round the train, a ten-minute run back to Pukeoware Workshops, a 15-minute workshop inspection visit and a ten-minute run back to Glenbrook.

When the train is not at Glenbrook station hand jigger rides are available within the station yard and motor jigger rides are available to Morley Road level crossing, a round trip of four kilometres.

Special operating days
During the course of an operating season, special events are organised featuring a range of unique operations. 
These include – Lego Weekends, Santa Days, Steam Festivals, Easter Celebrations, Day Out With Thomas Weekends, and events specific to each operating season.

Day out with Thomas
The most popular events operated by the railway, two trains up to six carriages long depart Glenbrook half-hourly between 10 am and 4 pm, usually.

A smaller "shuttle train" operates in the siding linking the railway to the KiwiRail network. Often hauled by small diesel locomotive "Basil" in earlier years, the service has also been operated by WW 480 "Terry the Tank Engine" and more recently by "Thomas the Tank Engine" – a visitor to the railway. The GVR's "Thomas" is Bagnall 2475, owned by the Mainline Steam Trust and formerly used at the Tomoana Freezing Works, Hastings.

Double-decker buses, traction engines, vintage cars and other related displays have also been presented at these events over the years.

On "Day Out With Thomas" weekends, trains only travel to Fernleigh, before returning to Pukeoware and Glenbrook.

Railfan Day
The first Railfan Day was held in February 1996, specifically a celebration to dedicate the National Network fleet van FM 1133 to the memory of past long-time treasurer Arthur Tichener and celebrate the completion of the overhaul of historic carriage C 472. A variety of passenger and mixed trains was run culminating in an impressive steam train triple-headed by Silver Stream Railway's C 847, WW 480 and GVR No. 4, the ex-Taupo Totara Timber Company (Mallet).

Since then various similar events have been held with special passenger and freight workings featuring a range of historic rolling stock and locomotives. These events usually run with resident locomotives and rolling stock, although visiting locomotives have occasionally made appearances, such as the Museum of Transport and Technology's (MOTAT) L 507, which attended the 2009 Railfan Festival.

Steam traction festivals
Steam festivals combine displays of various steam-powered vehicles on one major site. The Glenbrook Vintage Railway staged its first festival in Easter 2002, to celebrate its Silver Jubilee. A myriad of visiting railway locomotives, steam boats, miniature locomotives, static steam engines and even a steam-powered car were features. Trains operated on a half-hourly basis each of the four days of the festival and the visiting Pleasant Point Model T railcar also operated in the schedule.

Two DC locomotives pulled a special train on Saturday from Wellsford to Glenbrook and back (and associated empty runs from Otahuhu to Wellsford and back before and after the passenger service) to bring patrons to the event and the following day, Mainline Steam's J 1211 hauled a train from Auckland, whilst JB 1236 returned the train to Auckland. Numerous steam train runs also operated across the Mission Bush branch line to Pukekohe on the Sunday also.

A second steam festival was held in February 2007, incorporating a visit from 7nhp Burrell 'Scenic Special' showman's engine Quo Vadis (wrks. No. 3938) and associated carousel. The weekend also celebrated the re-launch of WW 644 into service after 37 years in storage and overhaul. This event was much lower-key, with no visiting engines attending this event.

A third steam festival took place at Waitangi weekend 2009. The opening event was a special evening on Thursday 5 February. Historic 19th century visiting tank engine L 207 (from MOTAT) operated a demonstration freight train (including a rare mainline appearance by historic 3-axle carriage C 472), followed by the recreation of an original New Zealand "trial rail-motor" from the beginning of the 20th century (which comprised one small tank engine pulling one of four purpose built 60 ft car/vans). The train comprised L 207 and the recently restored dining car van "Kurahaupo" (AF 1182), which was one of the original purpose-built trial rail-motor carriages.

Between Friday 6 February and Sunday 8 February, there were many activities including ploughing, steam boats, steam cars, stalls, heritage displays and equipment. Steam trains ran half-hourly throughout the weekend including appearances by L 207, WW 644, JA 1250 and Mainline Steam's JA1275 which had arrived under her own power from Parnell on Saturday morning. WW 480 was on standby duties outside the depot along with a number of locomotives normally in storage or awaiting overhaul such as recent arrivals A 423 and WAB 800.

A fourth festival took place on the weekend of 23 and 24 March 2013, which included the first public showing of a half scale replica Newcomen engine, built by the Auckland Steam Engine Society. This engine stands 5.5 metres tall and is based on the engines built 300 years before at the dawn of the industrial age to pump water from mines. Six locomotives took part in the passenger hauling during the weekend. There were displays of vintage machinery including traction engines under steam. A vintage Bell helicopter in mobile army surgical hospital colours as used in the Korean war was giving rides. Steam launches gave rides on the small lake while others were on display.

Other events
Other events have included "Railroad Country", "The Great Train Race", "Santa Day" and a "Military" weekend. The first two events have only happened once in the 1990s.

Volunteer crewing
The two core teams at the heart of every operational day are the Operations Branch and the Commercial Branch. Typically Commercial Branch members can be identified by their roles associated with the functions of Glenbrook Station, while the Operations Branch can be identified by their roles associated with the functions of physically operating the train and manning the signalling system at Glenbrook Station and Pukeoware Depot.

Commercial team
Based at Glenbrook Station, primary roles include the preparation of the station service scape and cleanliness prior to customers arrival, selling of tickets from the ticket office, sales of stock from the bookstall and souvenir shop, the preparation and sales of refreshments from the refreshment rooms, operation of hand-powered and motorised jiggers, assisting of parking on special operating days and customer service within the station complex.

Operations team
Based at Pukeoware Depot, roles in the operation team usually require training and qualification – usually gained after experience at entry level roles such as those in the Commercial Branch teams or as Assistant Guards aboard the train.

Key roles:

Train Controller/Signalman: Based at Glenbrook Station, in the signal box, he has overall charge of the days operation of the railway, primarily focusing on safe operations of multiple vehicles (either two or more trains on peak days, or trains and jiggers on standard operating days), signalling train services into and out of the station and maintaining the schedule through efficient turn around at Glenbrook station.
Engine Driver: Based aboard the locomotive, managing safe operations of the train, the preparation and presentation of the operating locomotive, maintaining responsibility for operation of the train and shunting manoeuvrings – before, during and after public operations, co-operating with the fireman to maintain steam pressure in the course of operations, co-operation with the train running crew to ensure efficient turn around at Victoria Ave., Fernleigh, or Glenbrook station stops, communications with controllers to ensure safety of the train and other vehicles using the railway etc.
Fireman: Based aboard the locomotive, taking direction from the engine driver to ensure safe operations of the train, the preparation and presentation of the operating locomotive, assisting in operations of the train and shunting manoeuvrings – before, during and after public operations, managing the water and fire to maintain steam pressure, co-operation with the train running crew to ensure efficient turn around at Victoria Ave., Fernleigh, or Glenbrook station stops, etc. In most cases, firemen will either be contemplating, or training to become fully qualified engine drivers.
Cleaner: Based aboard the locomotive, taking direction from engine driver to ensure safe operations of the train, assisting with piloting and shunting movements (including coupling and uncoupling operations), completing the preparation and presentation of the operating locomotive, taking direction from the fireman (in most cases cleaners will be either preparing to begin training, or be under training to become qualified firemen) during the course of operations – particularly in resupply of coal and water, assisting with the shutting down and cleaning of the locomotive at the end of the operating day etc.
Guard: Responsible for on board safety and customer service on the train. Looking after passenger safety and managing vehicle safety through the train's consist whilst in operation. Managing safe embarkation and disembarkation at passenger stops. Operating the trains brake system including brake tests and communications with the locomotive crew to ensure brakes are always applied or released when need be. Signalling the train into motion from scheduled passenger stops and any unscheduled stops (such as watering at Waitangi Stream). Managing the assistant guards to ensure safe operation of the train and the highest level of customer service. Managing the commercial information from the days operation including train consist details (i.e., engine and carriage registrations), schedule performance, passenger numbers, noting potential impacts of patronage or unusual operating events etc.
Assistant Guard: Taking direction from the guard to ensure on board safety and delivery of customer service aboard the train. Assisting the guard in managing passengers and vehicle safety through the train's consist whilst in operation. Taking direction from the guard to manage embarkation and disembarkation at passenger stops. Taking direction from the guard and locomotive crew to assist with the operation of the trains braking system where necessary. Communicating with the guard to ensure that the train is safe for a proposed departure. Assisting the guard with relevant commercial information that needs to be recorded etc.
OIC (officer in charge) Pukeoware: Based at Pukeoware Station, managing the overall operations in and about the Pukeoware depot, primarily focusing on safe operations of multiple vehicles (either multiple trains or internal depot shunting services), signalling train services in co-operation with the train controller, maintaining schedule through efficient turn-around at Pukeoware station, managing the Pukeoware Road level crossing, etc.

Buildings and facilities

Glenbrook House
Relocated from Waiuku and restored in 1995, Glenbrook House serves as the GVR's training and meeting facility. Located alongside the railway line, as was traditional of railway houses, the building is also used as a preparation and storage area prior to large events such as steam festivals and the Friends of Thomas events.

Pukeoware Workshop
The railway undertakes restoration projects at its workshop, located at Pukeoware, some four kilometres from Glenbrook. The site consists of a heavy engineering workshops in its main yard (with facilities for locomotive overhaul and mechanical engineering), a car and wagon shop in the north yard (specialising in carpentry and paint work) and three carriage storage sheds. The railway has been recognised on numerous occasions at the annual Federation of Rail Organisations NZ (formerly National Federation of Rail Societies) conference awards evening for various locomotive and carriage restorations.

Each track in a carriage shed holds between three and four standard  carriages. As an example the third shed holds 12 standard  carriages across three tracks, with a recently added lean-to addition adding another eight carriage lengths to the shed's capacity. A further extension to the rear of the shed is now being planned after approval of a grant by the ASB Community Trust. This ensures ongoing conservation of historic railway items.

Apart from maintaining and restoring items for use on the GVR and national excursions, the workshops have also been involved heavily in contracted restoration work of other organisations rolling stock such as Silver Stream Railways C 847 in 1994 and Mainline Steams KA 942 in 1990. The workshop also assisted in the preparation of two carriages for the Carriage's Cafe restaurant in Kumeu, and filming of episodes of the Heroes television series on the Tangiwai disaster and Who Dares Wins.

Shady Rest
A converted former guard's van has been converted into "Shady Rest" – two basic units for volunteers staying overnight. Originally built for husband and wife teams (and each unit comprising one double bed, and two bunk beds). The unit has been valuable for volunteers when preparing for major events at the railway or excursions away with the GVR's national network fleet.

Signal box
Glenbrook Station is the site for the restored former Auckland 'B' signalbox. The box used to stand in the former Auckland yards, near Gladstone Rd, on the location where the current North Island Main Trunk line now passes to go towards Britomart Transport Centre. The box has been fully restored and received a Rail Heritage Trust of New Zealand Restoration Award in recognition of the work. The box controls all signals at Glenbrook, the western end mainline points and the points to the fully restored ex Papakura turntable.

Station buildings
The railway has a number of historic station buildings in its care, all being from former New Zealand Railways stations.
Glenbrook Station's terminal building is made up of the original Waiuku Branchline Glenbrook station and Patumahoe station buildings.
Glenbrook Station's picnic area shelter (and eventual platform 2 building) is the former Kingsland suburban station shelter, moved to Glenbrook in 2003 to make way for the double-tracking of Auckland's Western Line
Morley Rd's station building is the original Pukeoware station building.

Rolling stock

Steam locomotives
 JA 1250 (ex NZR)  tender. Built 1949 by Hillside Workshops in Dunedin, JA 1250 was purchased by Phil Goldman in 1972. Returned to service in 1982 and operated the first excursion on the mainline by steam power in 1985, after running regularly on the mainline network all over New Zealand 1250 was withdrawn in 1992 and a major overhaul started in 1995 with the loco being outshopped in 1998. At Phil Goldman's death in 2007, the locomotive was bequeathed to the GVR. 1250 was withdrawn in 2017 and is currently under overhaul.
 No. 1 – WW 480 (ex NZR)  tank. Built 1910 by Hillside Workshops in Dunedin, purchased by the GVR in 1969, returned to service at the Papakura locomotive depot in 1976. 480 operated until 1997 and was overhauled until 2002, withdrawn for mechanical repairs and returned to service in March 2013. Pulled back out of service in May later that year due to the condition of the boiler. A new boiler was built for 480 and the loco attained her boiler ticket on 24 May 2018 and is now in service.
 No. 2 – WW 644 (Ex NZR)  tank. Built 1915 by Hillside Workshops in Dunedin, returned to service in 2007. The locomotive is now under overhaul getting a new boiler and left hand cylinder fitted.
 No. 4 – Ex-Taupo Totara Timber Co. Mallet No. 7,  tender locomotive. Built in 1912 by the American Locomotive Company at Schenectady, New York, GVR No. 4 is known as the railway's flagship engine. It is NZ's only Mallet Compound Steam Engine. GVR No. 4 last worked in 2001 and has been stored since, occasionally it is brought out of storage for display at various events, such as its 100th birthday in 2012 when it was displayed in the private siding at Glenbrook and was given a cosmetic do over for the railway's 40th Anniversary in 2017, where it was propelled into Glenbrook station to recreate the official opening in 1977.
 F 233 (ex NZR)  tank. Built in 1885 by Robert Stephenson at Newcastle upon Tyne, F 233 was either purchased from or donated by AFFCo Southdown in 1964 and went on display at the former Onehunga Railway Station in Alfred St (the RES clubrooms) until 1984. It is stored at the Pukeoware workshops, carrying the name 'Ada'. The locomotive is unique in having a non-standard saddle tank, which was fitted by AFFCo.

Locomotives stored for other groups
 A 423 (ex NZR)  tender. Built 1909 by A & G Price at Thames, this locomotive is owned by Kevin and Paul Jowett and was formerly displayed at the Te Awamutu Railway Museum between 1971 and 2008. It is stored at Pukeoware.
 FA 250 (Ex NZR)  tank. Built 1892 by Addington Workshops in Christchurch from 0-6-0ST F 250. Donated to the New Zealand Railway and Locomotive Society (Waikato Branch) by the Whakatane Board Mills in 1967, FA 250 was leased out to the Goldfields Railway and later the Waitara Railway Preservation Society. The locomotive was under overhaul when it was returned to the NZR&LS, and arrived at the GVR in September 2010. It was partway through its overhaul, and remains disassembled.
 JA 1275 (ex NZR) . Was preserved by Les Hostick in 1967 and stored at the Te Awamutu Railway Museum at Te Awamutu, 1972. It sat on static display under a rudimentary shelter until 1994 when it was leased to Ian Welch and transferred to the Mainline Steam Heritage Trust's Parnell depot for restoration to main line running condition. Work began in 2001, and in 2004 JA 1275 returned to the main line rails. It has proven a reliable locomotive and sees frequent use on excursions.
 J 1211 (ex NZR) . Purchased by a syndicate from NZR 1971 and moved to Steam Incorporated. Purchased outright by Ian Welch in 1978, and moved to Glenbrook Vintage Railway for restoration prior to its lease to the Bay of Islands Vintage Railway in 1985–86. Restored to mainline standard and fitted with original style streamlining and returned to service in 1988. Converted to oil firing from October 1995 to December later that year. Named Gloria in preservation.
 WAB 800 (ex NZR)  tank. Built 1927 by A & G Price at Thames. WAB 800 was purchased in 1967 by the NZR&LS (Waikato Branch) and displayed at Te Awamutu from 1967 to 2008. The locomotive arrived in May 2008.

Former resident locomotives
 AB 832 (ex NZR)  tender. Built 1925 by North British Locomotive Company at Glasgow, Scotland. Leased from MOTAT, AB 832 arrived in October 1996. It was the last steam locomotive to see scheduled service in the North Island in December 1967, and is in storage at Pukeoware. This locomotive was returned to MOTAT in August 2018.
 J 1234 (ex NZR)  tender. Built 1939 by North British Locomotive Company at Glasgow, Scotland. This locomotive is owned by Steam Incorporated of Paekakariki, and was leased to the RES/GVR in 1998. Arriving in September 1998, it adopted the character of 'Wally' for the 1998 "Friends of Thomas" event in place of WW 480. The locomotive was returned to Paekakariki in June 2015.

Diesel locomotives
The diesel roster used for Ways and Works, Shunting, and other purposes, comprises:

Resident locomotives
 No. 3 – An ex-New Zealand Ministry of Works 30 hp Ruston and Hornsby , GVR No. 3 was the railway's first locomotive. It is maintained in operational condition.
 No. 7 – formerly DS 207 (TMS DS 94). This locomotive is the sole survivor of the original four Ds locos imported by NZR in 1949 and is under overhaul.
 No. 8 – formerly DE 507 (TMS DE 1372). This locomotive is operational, and is used for occasional passenger service and regular work trains. The locomotive is operating as DE 507, although it did carry its identity as GVR No. 8 in early 2010. 
 No. 9 – formerly DE 509. The locomotive is nonoperational and stored at Pukeoware. This locomotive did see some use in the 1980s on work trains, but was placed into storage and has not operated since.
 No. 10 – formerly DSA 243 (TMS DSA 455). This locomotive is one of three surviving Bagnall-built DSA class locomotives. The DSA arrived in 1988 as a replacement for No. 5, which had been damaged while being returned from another railway. It received an overhaul in 2008 and was repainted from GVR yellow into NZR red, but retaining its present identity as GVR No. 10.
 No. 11 – DBR 1254. Built as DB 1005 by General Motors in Canada, and rebuilt into DBR 1254 in 1982. The locomotive was purchased in August 2017 and arrived at the GVR on 3 November 2017. Mainline cerified.
 No. 12 – DBR 1295. Built as DB 1013 by General Motors in Canada, and rebuilt into DBR 1295 in 1982. The locomotive was purchased in August 2017 and arrived at the GVR on 3 November 2017. It has been repainted in the original "fruit salad" colour scheme and is in service on the GVR.
 No. 14 – DCP 4818. Built as DA 1481 by General Motors in Canada, and rebuilt into DC 4818 in 1983. The locomotive was purchased in December 2018. It arrived at the GVR on 25 April 2019. It is currently under overhaul with the intention of becoming mainline certified.
 No. 15 – DC4536. Built as DA 1505 by General Motors in Canada, and rebuilt into DC 4536 in 1983. The locomotive's purchase was announced in September 2021, being funded by a long-time supporter. For eventual overhaul with the intention of becoming mainline certified.

Privately owned locomotives
DA 1429 (TMS DA 322). This locomotive is operational, and is equipped with the necessary equipment to work on the main line. Stored by agreement with Dean McQuoid, arrived on site in November 2010.

Former resident locomotives
DA 1410 (TMS DA 126). This locomotive was leased from Steam Incorporated by the RES, and arrived on site in September 1998. The locomotive was returned to Steam Incorporated's Paekakariki site in June 2015.
DA 1431 (TMS DA 345). This locomotive was leased from Steam Incorporated with DA 1410 in 1998 and later ended up in storage. It returned to Paekakariki in 2008 and has since been restored to operational condition with the necessary equipment to allow it to work on the main line.
No. 5 – formerly DSA 230. Drewry DSA 230 was often loaned out to other groups by the GVR, but this practice ended in 1988 when the locomotive was towed while in gear. The result was the transmission was damaged beyond repair, and so Bagnall DSA 455 was obtained as a replacement. The remains of DSA 230 were then stripped of all useful parts and the remains lingered at Pukeoware until they were scrapped in 1990.

Self-propelled equipment
 Railcar RM 32 "Pangatoru" –.Stored, previously owned by the New Zealand Railway and Locomotive Society Waikato Branch, arrived on site December 2001.
 Plasser & Theurer Ballast tamper 864 – Under Light Repairs, heavily used in civil engineering works (recent large projects include tamping 900 metres of relaid track between Glenbrook and Morley Road, Waiuku Extension works beyond Fernleigh and a 1998 project to tamp most of the lightweight rail track on the Dargaville Branch in Northland.
 Cowans Sheldon crane 224 – operational. Heavily used in mechanical engineering and civil engineering works including lifting locomotive boilers, carriage bodies, track sets and other equipment. Can be included in a train, or travel (albeit slowly) under its own power.

Passenger carriages

Domestic carriages
The domestic passenger fleet comprises late 19th and early 20th century rolling stock. Most vehicles are the traditional narrow-bodied A series wooden carriages, turned out in a red livery, featuring opening windows and outdoor viewing balconies on each end. These carriages either have side-facing longitudinal seating or arrangements of paired seating on one side of the aisle and singular seating on the other. These carriages are named after the Māori migration canoes that brought the Māori people to New Zealand from Hawaiki.

The core fleet of carriages includes or has included:
 AF 804 "Tainui",  carriage incorporating guards' compartment and luggage area.
 A 1161 "Mataatua",  standard passenger carriage
 A 1162 "Aotea",  standard passenger carriage
 A 1222 "Te Arawa",  standard passenger carriage fitted with longitudinal seating
 F 141 "Nga Tira", former  guards' van, with the luggage and storage area converted into a covered outdoor viewing carriage. Fondly known as the "Chicken Coop"
 VB 624 "Waka Whenua", former steam crane support wagon, converted into an uncovered outdoor viewing carriage.
 UB 1554 "Nga Hau", an outdoor viewing carriage was retired from service in 1998 and scrapped in 2002 following condemning. Waka Whenua was built in 1993 as a replacement.

Notable unique carriages which are operated on special occasions include...
 C 472, a very historic Clemenson-Patent six-wheeled carriage, built by the Oldbury Car Company, England in 1879. Originally used on Auckland's first railway, the Onehunga Branch (which utilised this style carriage), it was relocated by ship to the Donnellys Crossing Section. After being withdrawn in 1933, the carriage body was donated to the Donnellys Crossing Axemans Association. In 1989, the Railway Enthusiasts Society purchased the carriage and moved it to Pukeoware for a full restoration, which was completed in 1996. The carriage runs at special event days, such as on Glenbrook yard rides at the Day out with Thomas event.
 A 543 "Manakura",  clerestory roof kitchen/diner carriage with seating for 25, coal fired range and stunning stained glass windows (in the clerestory). Withdrawn from service in 2002 for an overhaul, the carriage is stored.
 A 1452,  "wide-body" carriage restored as a parlour carriage featuring a bar, plush leather lounge and extended outdoor viewing area specifically for charter work. Intended to be a partner carriage to Af 1182, this carriage has been turned out in the same green livery to match the dining carriage.
 AF 1182,  carriage with a guards compartment and luggage area. Built with 72 seats for Auckland commuter trains, the carriage is currently being converted for use as a dining car.  This includes food preparation and servery area. The car will also be fitted with a toilet. The carriage has been turned out in a green livery and operated in public service for the first time at the "Friends of Thomas Weekend" of 8 and 9 November 2008. In 2016 the carriage entered the carriage workshop for the conversion work.

National network fleet
The railway owns a fleet of carriages, known as the "mainline fleet", formerly owned by the parent body (Railway Enthusiasts Society) and leased to the railway. The fleet has undergone an overhaul and re-certification with KiwiRail. Excursions have seen them tour all around New Zealand, including to Gisborne, New Plymouth, Whakatane, Bay of Islands, Wellington, Christchurch, Arthurs Pass and Timaru.

Turned out in the original Glenbrook Vintage Railway livery of yellow bodies, white ceilings and chocolate lining, the fleet consists of the following vehicles...

Four carriages built in the early 20th century for the (then) newly opened North Island Main Trunk express services, before being relocated onto Auckland commuter train services post war through to retirement in the early 1970s:
Currently on loan to Steam Incorporated.
These carriages are fully certified for operations on the KiwiRail network, and the original "drop toilets" have been upgraded with chemical retention holding tanks.

Three carriages built during World War II to replace the original North Island Main Trunk express service carriages, and later allocated to Auckland commuter trains from the 1970s to retirement in 1994.
 A 1948 (TMS A56496), NZR 56-foot carriage. Built in 1939 at Addington Workshops, Christchurch. Overhauled at United Group's Hutt Workshops and returned to Pukeoware in May 2008. Carriage restoration completed in October 2009. First operation on the KiwiRail network in private ownership on 17 April 2011.
 A 1926 (TMS AL56112),  steel-panelled carriage built in 1939 at Otahuhu Workshops, Auckland with vestibule guards area. Overhauled at United Group's Hutt Workshops, Wellington, and returned to Pukeoware in March 2009. Carriage restoration completed in March 2011. First operation on the KiwiRail network in private ownership on 17 April 2011.
 AL 1991 (TMS AL56037),  steel-panelled carriage with separate guard/luggage compartment, built in 1940 at Addington Workshops, Christchurch. Previously certified

Five 'small window' former KiwiRail charter fleet carriages.
 A56263 (NZR A 1918), NZR 56-foot carriage. Built in 1939 at Otahuhu Workshops, Auckland. Arrived at GVR in October 2013. Currently under overhaul for mainline use.
 A56121 (NZR A 1897), NZR 56-foot carriage. Built in 1941 at Otahuhu Workshops, Auckland. Arrived at GVR in June 2013. Currently under overhaul for mainline use.
 A56030 (NZR A 1860), NZR 56-foot carriage. Built in 1938 at Otahuhu Workshops, Auckland. Arrived at GVR in June 2013. Currently stored pending overhaul.
 A56180 (NZR A 1908), NZR 56-foot carriage. Built in 1939 at Otahuhu Workshops, Auckland. Arrived at GVR in June 2013. Currently stored pending overhaul.
 A56742 (NZR A 1985), NZR 56-foot carriage. Built in 1943 at Addington Workshops, Christchurch. Arrived at GVR in October 2013. Currently stored pending overhaul.

Three 'big window' former KiwiRail charter fleet (previously Overlander and Tranz Alpine) carriages.
 ASO1, NZR 56-foot carriage with servery and large rear window. Built in 1941 at Addington Workshops, Christchurch. Arrived at GVR on 8 September 2018. Currently stored pending overhaul.
 ASO110, NZR 56-foot carriage with servery. Built in 1939 at Otahuhu Workshops, Auckland. Arrived at GVR on 8 September 2018. Currently stored pending overhaul.
 AO198, NZR 56-foot carriage. Built in 1939 at Addington Workshops, Christchurch. Arrived at GVR on 8 September 2018. Currently stored pending overhaul.

Guard's Van FM 1133 was built as a three-module van for freight service in 1981. Withdrawn when guards were no longer required on freight trains, the RES converted one module into a storage area, the middle module into a crew area and the third module into a fully functioning kitchen for catering on excursion trains. The van is currently out of service pending major repairs including fitting of refurbished bogies.

Generator and Luggage Van AG49 is currently on lease from KiwiRail and is intended to be used to power GVR's AO carriage fleet.

Wooden Guard's Van F 394 (TMS F285) was built in 1913 and used on the 2008 Parliamentary Special and Governor's Special, in green livery.

Mainline Guard's Van F 601 (TMS F1397) was built in 1944 at Otahuhu Workshops, Auckland. Was stored at the Goldfields Railway and was relocated to Glenbrook in 2021.

Former Auckland Transport AT MAXX SA and SD class

The Railway Enthusiasts Society purchased 9x SA and 4x SD carriages in 2021 for their future charter and tourism needs, which are in the process of being tested and certified in order to be hauled north from Taumarunui, then into storage for the time being. They were used in sets of four, five, or six with DC, DCP, DFT, or DFB locomotives until 2014/15 as they were phased out as the Auckland Suburban network was electrified:

 SA class: SA5638, SA5770, SA5703, SA5818, SA5743, SA5829, SA5617, SA5695, SA5730
 SD class: SD3199, SD5652, SD5762, SD5842

Along with these passenger carriages, it is expected that water support wagon UC 686, steam locomotives JA 1250, WW 480, and WW 644 will also be certified for KiwiRail network operations in the future.

Freight wagons and way and works vehicles
A large selection of freight wagons has been purchased, donated or leased. The railway has found use for many of the railway wagons that it has acquired and displays them on demonstration runs and for photographers' specials. The set includes a full rake of ballast wagons and plough van, which have been used during large-scale works such as the Waiuku Extension and major track renewal. Other items include replica workman's hut, refrigerated wagons, cement wagons and bulk oil tanks.

See also
 List of New Zealand railway museums and heritage lines

References

Citations

Bibliography

External links
Glenbrook Vintage Railway

Heritage railways in New Zealand
Tourist attractions in the Auckland Region
Transport in the Auckland Region
3 ft 6 in gauge railways in New Zealand